Cries and Whispers is a live album by bassist Dominic Duval recorded in 1999 and released on the Cadence Jazz label.

Reception

Allmusic reviewer Steve Loewy states "this is one of the finest examples of free jazz at the turn of the century as you are likely to find, performed by five respected practitioners of the genre". In JazzTimes Aaron Steinberg noted "Overall, Cries and Whispers is not an easy album to listen to, and Duval's advocates already know what they're getting into with this. Nevertheless, Duval and his men modulate this program very well; they pay attention not only to mood, tempo and dynamics, but also to form, structure and development in a way that doesn't retard their improvisational aims but still makes for great and listenable chunks of music".

Track listing 
All compositions by Domenic Duval.
 "Cries and Whispers I" – 13:40
 "Cries and Whispers II" – 5:19
 "Cries and Whispers III" – 8:13
 "Cries and Whispers IV" – 10:57
 "Cries and Whispers V" – 9:08
 "Cries and Whispers VI" – 10:35
 "Cries and Whispers VII" – 5:58

Personnel 
Dominic Duval – bass
Joe McPhee – tenor saxophone, flugelhorn
Mark Whitecage – alto clarinet, alto saxophone
Jason Hwang – violin
Tomas Ulrich – cello

References 

2001 live albums
Cadence Jazz Records live albums
Dominic Duval live albums